The National Japanese American Veterans Memorial Court (Nikkei Beikokujin Taiekigunjin Ireihi) is a national memorial court in Los Angeles, California, honoring the bravery and sacrifice of Japanese American veterans during World War II, the Korean War, and the Vietnam War. It is maintained by and located adjacent to the Japanese American Cultural & Community Center on San Pedro Street, in Little Tokyo.

Japanese American Vietnam War Veterans Memorial
The Japanese American Vietnam War Veterans Memorial is similar in appearance to the Vietnam Veterans Memorial, consisting of three black granite slabs, on which the names of 116 Japanese American veterans are carved. The base of the memorial bears the following inscription:

Planning
The planning for the memorial began in Los Angeles during the summer of 1987. The Japanese American Vietnam Veterans' Memorial Committee was formed in order to construct a memorial to honor Japanese American veterans who were killed in action or were listed as missing in action. This committee consisted of Duane Ebata, Gary Hayakawa, Ken Hayashi, Dennis Ishiki, Victor Kato, Dave Kobyashi, Lance Matsushita, Mike Nagaoka, Mel Nakashima, Vincent Okamoto, Tom Okamura, Ed Sakihama, and George Tanaka.

By the time of the Vietnam War, the United States military had completely integrated, which prevented the designers from distinguishing Japanese Americans among those that served. Enlistment and casualty records were of little assistance and frequently inaccurate, occasionally listing Japanese Americans as "Indonesian" or "Eskimo". This made it impossible to find all Japanese American veterans of the Vietnam War. In 1988, the committee began sorting through the complete list of all 58,159 names on the Vietnam Veterans Memorial for last names that were obviously Japanese.

After compiling the list, they come to a total of 99 killed in action and 14 missing in action. It would be almost seven years before the committee was able to locate a suitable spot to begin construction. The Japanese American Cultural & Community Center agreed to the memorial's construction at 244 San Pedro Street. It was dedicated on Veteran's Day, 11 November 1995.

See also
 Bainbridge Island Japanese American Exclusion Memorial
 Day of Remembrance (Japanese Americans)
 Densho: The Japanese American Legacy Project
 Empty Chair Memorial
 Fred Korematsu Day
 Go for Broke Monument
 Harada House
 Japanese American Memorial to Patriotism During World War II
 Sakura Square

References

Monuments and memorials in Los Angeles
Japanese-American memorials
Japanese-American culture in Los Angeles
Little Tokyo, Los Angeles
Outdoor sculptures in Greater Los Angeles